Valery Vladimirovich Bogdanov (born 9 June 1966; died 15 June 2010) was a Russian football player.

References

1966 births
2010 deaths
Soviet footballers
FC Luch Vladivostok players
Russian footballers
Russian Premier League players
FC Okean Nakhodka players
Russian expatriate footballers
Expatriate footballers in China
Russian expatriate sportspeople in China
Association football midfielders
Sportspeople from Vladivostok